Nikola Božidarević (more commonly Nicholas of Ragusa (1460 – 26 November 1517/18), was a painter from Venetian Dalmatia at the turn of the Gothic in the Renaissance.

Life
The son of the painter Božidar Vlatković of Slano, he was probably born in Kotor (today Montenegro) around 1460. He was mentioned in 1475 as a fresco painter at the Rector's Palace, Dubrovnik and in 1476 as a pupil of painter Petar Ognjanović, whose workshop in 1477 was based on the doctrine of Venice.

He was a hard-working and greatly sought-after man, as can be seen from numerous documents and contracts kept in the Dubrovnik archives. Monasteries like the Franciscans in Cavtat and the Dubrovnik Dominicans commissioned works from him, as did noble families and individuals and some churches. After a long stay in Italy, he reappears in Dubrovnik in 1494, where he and his father concluded an agreement for polyptych on Gradić's altar in the Dubrovnik Dominican church.

Works
Of  seventeen works by Nikola Božidarević recorded in the Dubrovnik Archives, only four paintings remain: a triptych on a side altar in the Bumdevič Chapel of the Dominican monastery in Dubrovnik, The Annunciation in the art gallery of the Dominican church, the Durdevič family's altarpiece in the capitulary hall of the Dominican monastery, and another triptych in the Franciscan church on Lopud has also been ascribed to him.

Some modern author credit Božidarević's work as a part of Serbian art and Croatian art.

See also
 Lovro Dobričević
 Mihajlo Hamzić

References

People from Dubrovnik
15th-century births
1517 deaths
16th-century painters
Ragusan painters
Painters from Venice